HMS Bonaventure was an  second class cruiser of the Royal Navy, ordered as part of the eight-ship Astraea class under the Naval Defence Act of 1889. She was commissioned for service in 1895, and survived to serve in the First World War.

History

Bonaventure served in the Pacific Squadron, including service in the 3rd China War, under command of Captain Robert Montgomerie RN.

She returned in May 1906 to Devonport to be paid off.  She then went to Haulbowline Dockyard, Cork, Ireland to be converted into a depot ship for submarines. This work was completed in April 1907 and she continued to serve during the First World War as a submarine depot ship.

Scrapping
Bonaventure returned to the UK and was paid off on 17 October 1919. She was sold on 12 April 1920 to the Forth Ship Breaking Company, Bo'ness.

References

External links

Publications
 
 

Astraea-class cruisers
Ships built in Plymouth, Devon
1892 ships
World War I cruisers of the United Kingdom
Royal Navy Submarine Depot Ships